Red Amnesia is a 2014 Chinese thriller film directed by Wang Xiaoshuai.  The film deals with the psychological impact of an elderly retired widow (played by Lü Zhong)'s past.  Wang considers Red Amnesia to be the last film of his Cultural Revolution trilogy, which includes 2005's Shanghai Dreams and 2011's 11 Flowers. The film was released on April 30, 2015.

Synopsis
Red Amnesia follows a family living in modern Beijing. Deng Meijuan, a widowed lady, lives on her own in a small rundown flat. Her relationships with her sons are strained - Elder son, Jun, is married and lives in a comfortable and modern apartment with his family, while younger son, Bing, has a boyfriend who Deng pretends she does not know about. Deng visits her sons and elderly mother at a nursing home regularly.

Soon, Deng's comfortable life pattern is disrupted by strange occurrences, consequences of a decision she had made during the Cultural Revolution, that no doubt had impacted the lives of others in the present.

Cast
Lü Zhong as Deng Meijuan
Feng Yuanzheng as Deng Jun, son of Meijuan
Qin Hailu as Deng Lu, wife of Deng Jun
Qin Hao as Deng Bing, younger brother of Jun
Shi Liu
Han Yibo as boyfriend of Bing

Reception
The film was selected in competition for the Golden Lion at the 71st Venice International Film Festival. It also appeared as a Special Presentations at the 2014 Toronto International Film Festival.

Actress Lü Zhong won the award for Best Performance by an Actress at the 8th Asia Pacific Screen Awards for her performance in the film.

As of May 11, the film had earned $1.42 million at the Chinese box office.

References

External links

2014 films
Films directed by Wang Xiaoshuai
Chinese thriller films
2014 thriller films